Yana Chaka (Quechua yana black, chaka bridge, "black bridge", hispanicized spelling Yanachaca) is a mountain in the Andes of Peru whose summit reaches about  above sea level. It is located in the Pasco Region, Daniel Alcides Carrión Province, Yanahuanca District, west of a lake named Atalaya.

References

Mountains of Peru
Mountains of Pasco Region